Epidermolysis bullosa dystrophica or dystrophic EB (DEB) is an inherited disease affecting the skin and other organs.

"Butterfly child" is the colloquial name for a child born with the disease, as their skin is seen to be as delicate and fragile as the wings of a butterfly.

Signs and symptoms
The deficiency in anchoring fibrils impairs the adherence between the epidermis and the underlying dermis. The skin of DEB patients is thus highly susceptible to severe blistering. Collagen VII is also associated with the epithelium of the esophageal lining, and DEB patients may have chronic scarring, webbing, and obstruction of the esophagus. Affected individuals are often severely malnourished due to trauma to the oral and esophageal mucosa and require feeding tubes for nutrition. They also have iron-deficiency anemia of uncertain origin, which leads to chronic fatigue.

Open wounds on the skin heal slowly or not at all, often scarring extensively, and are particularly susceptible to infection. Many individuals bathe in a bleach and water mixture to fight off these infections. The chronic inflammation leads to errors in the DNA of the affected skin cells, which in turn causes squamous cell carcinoma (SCC). The majority of these patients die before the age of 30, either of SCC or complications related to DEB.

The chronic inflammatory state seen in recessive dystrophic epidermolysis bullosa (RDEB) may cause small fiber peripheral neuropathy (SFN); RDEB patients have reported the sensation of pain in line with neuropathic pain qualities.

Causes
DEB is caused by genetic defects (or mutations) within the human COL7A1 gene encoding the protein type VII collagen (collagen VII). DEB-causing mutations can be either dominant or recessive. Most families with family members with this condition have distinct mutations.

Collagen VII is a very large molecule (300 kDa) that dimerizes to form a semicircular looping structure: the anchoring fibril. Anchoring fibrils are thought to form a structural link between the epidermal basement membrane and the fibrillar collagens in the upper dermis.

Pathophysiology
In the absence of mutations of the COL7A1 gene, an autoimmune response against type VII collagen can result in an acquired form of epidermolysis bullosa called epidermolysis bullosa acquisita.

There exist other types of inherited epidermolysis bullosa, junctional epidermolysis bullosa and epidermolysis bullosa simplex, which are not related to type VII collagen deficiency. These arise from mutations in the genes encoding other proteins of the epidermis or the basement membrane at the junction between the epidermis and the dermis.

Diagnosis

Classification

See also
 Epidermolysis bullosa

References

Sources

External links 

 

Genodermatoses
Collagen disease